The 2020–21 LEN Champions League was the 58th edition of LEN's premier competition for men's water polo clubs.

Teams

Schedule
The schedule of the competition is as follows.

Qualification round

The qualification round is scheduled for 11–15 November 2020.

Group A

A1

A2

Final

|}

Group B

B1

B2

Final

|}

Preliminary round

LEN decided to play the 10 match-days of the 2020–21 LEN Champions League preliminary round in bubble format in three rounds, using two venues at each occasion. The ten match-days will be played in three rounds at two venues each time. Teams of the same group will contest three match-days, one time four, where the participants will be isolated for the entire duration of event because of the COVID-19 pandemic.

The draw for the group phase took place in Rome on 19 October 2020.

Group A

Group B

Final 8
3–5 June 2021, Belgrade, Serbia.

Qualified teams

Bracket

5th–8th place bracket

All times are local (UTC+2).

Quarterfinals

5th–8th place semifinals

Semifinals

Seventh place game

Fifth place game

Third place game

Final

Final ranking

Awards

See also
2020–21 LEN Euro Cup

References

Notes

External links
, len.microplustiming.com

 
2020
2020 in water polo
2021 in water polo
LEN Champions League
LEN Champions League